Lyramorpha is a genus of stink bugs in the family Tessaratomidae, subfamily Oncomerinae. It is known from Australia and New Guinea.

Description and life cycle 
As oncomerine insects, life cycle of Lyramorpha consists of the three stages of ,egg, nymph and adult. Eggs are barrel-shaped and are laid in groups of 40-42. From these hatch first-instar nymphs, which are soft, semi-globular in shape and slow-moving. Intermediate stage nymphs are extremely flattened in shape, allowing them to lie flat against leaves with the vulnerable legs under the body. Nymphs also have a pair of scent glands on top of their bodies, from which they produce a pungent liquid if disturbed.

In at least two species, L. rosea and L. parens, the first and second instars are chequered red and black, changing to a uniform red in later instars.

Both adults and the later instars of nymphs have a pair of points at the posterior end of the body, which can be seen in photographs.

Behaviour and diet 
Lyramorpha are active during the day (diurnal) and live on plants, from which they suck the sap. The two Australian species, L. rosea and L. parens, feed exclusively on plants in the family Sapindaceae. 

Older nymphs of L. parens are gregarious, feeding in groups and travelling as groups to new feeding sites. While travelling, they may occur on non-host plants.

Maternal care 
Females of some species in this genus are known to care for their offspring. Lyramorpha rosea broods eggs in clutches of up to 42, and there is one record of a L. parens brooding 40 eggs.

Lyramorpha parens continues brooding its offspring until at least the second nymphal instar. Another Lyramorpha species, possibly L. maculifer, has been observed brooding first-instar and second-instar nymphs.

Species 
The species in genus Lyramorpha are:

 Lyramorpha ambigua Horváth, 1900
 Lyramorpha basalis Horváth, 1900
 Lyramorpha breddini Horváth, 1900
 Lyramorpha brongersmai Blöte, 1952
 Lyramorpha diluta Stål, 1863
 Lyramorpha edulis Blöte, 1952
 Lyramorpha horvathi Blöte, 1952
 Lyramorpha impar Horváth, 1900
 Lyramorpha maculifer Tryon, 1892
 Lyramorpha parens Breddin, 1900
 Lyramorpha perelegans Vollenhoven, 1868
 Lyramorpha persimilis Horváth, 1900
 Lyramorpha picta Distant, 1893
 Lyramorpha plagifer Blöte, 1952
 Lyramorpha rosea Westwood, 1837
 Lyramorpha soror Breddin, 1900
 Lyramorpha vollenhoveni Stål, 1867

References 

Tessaratomidae